Carlisle Armory is a historic National Guard armory located at Carlisle, Cumberland County, Pennsylvania.  It was built in 1931, and consists of separate administration and stable buildings executed in the Colonial Revival style. It was designed by architect Thomas H. Atherton. The administration building is a two-story stone and brick building with a gable roof and two arched dormers.  The side gables feature Palladian windows.  The stable building is a one-story, gambrel roofed building with gable dormers. The stable building has been converted to offices, classrooms, locker rooms, and storage.

It was added to the National Register of Historic Places in 1989.

References

Armories on the National Register of Historic Places in Pennsylvania
Colonial Revival architecture in Pennsylvania
Government buildings completed in 1931
Buildings and structures in Cumberland County, Pennsylvania
National Register of Historic Places in Cumberland County, Pennsylvania